Parshuram Municipality is a municipality of Nepal located in Dadeldhura District of Sudurpashchim Province of Nepal. The municipality was established on 3 December 2014 together with the other 60 new municipalities.

Jogbuda and Shirsha villages were merged to form this new municipality.

The headquarter of the municipality is situated at Jogbuda town.

References

External links
 http://103.69.124.141/gis
 http://parshurammun.gov.np/en

Municipalities in Dadeldhura District
Nepal municipalities established in 2014